Nannoptopoma is a small genus of catfishes (order Siluriformes) of the family Loricariidae. This genus includes two species, N. spectabile and N. sternoptychum.

Taxonomy
Nannoptopoma is classified within the tribe Hypoptopomatini of the subfamily Hypoptopomatinae. It is most closely related to the genus Hypoptopoma with which it has a sister group relationship.

Distribution
N. spectabile is known from the upper Amazon and Orinoco basins of Colombia, and N. sternoptychum is known from the lower Amazon River basin and tributaries below 200 metres (660 ft) elevation.

Physical description
Nannoptopoma differs from other members of the subfamily Hypoptopomatinae by osteological differences. They have no adipose fin, a greatly depressed snout and head, eyes visible from below, and a body that is not elongate or depressed. This genus is most similar in external appearance to Hypoptopoma, though Nannoptopoma species lack pectoral fin spine serrae characteristics of Hypoptopoma and have a shorter, stockier body. Both species reach about 3 centimetres (1.2 in) SL.

N. sternoptychum differs from N. spectabile in head shape, pectoral fin length, and some meristic features.

Males have an elongate genital papilla and enlarged pelvic fin odontodes. Also, there is a patch of odontodes involving four paired plates on either side of the pre-anal shield between the pelvic fin origin and the anus, possibly involved in increased adhesion in mating encounters.

References

Hypoptopomatini
Fish of South America
Fish of the Amazon basin